Alfred Stanley Rowlands (born 12 November 1889) was a football player. He was a forward for Tranmere Rovers and scored 32 goals for Tranmere during the 1913–14 season, helping them to with the Lancashire Combination. In the same season, on 16 March 1914, Rowlands represented Wales in their 2–0 defeat to England; this was the first time a Tranmere player had played for their national team.

He also represented Wrexham, Nottingham Forest and Crewe Alexandra in the Football League.

References

1889 births
Date of death unknown
Welshpool Town F.C. players
Telford United F.C. players
Wrexham A.F.C. players
South Liverpool F.C. (1890s) players
Nottingham Forest F.C. players
Tranmere Rovers F.C. players
Reading F.C. players
Crewe Alexandra F.C. players
Oswestry Town F.C. players
Bideford A.F.C. players
Ilfracombe Town F.C. players
Barnstaple Town F.C. players
Wales international footballers
Welsh footballers
Association football forwards